Uropeltis petersi, commonly known as Peter's earth snake, Peters' shieldtail, and the shieldtail earth snake, is a species of nonvenomous snake in the family Uropeltidae. The species is endemic to India.

Etymology
The specific name, petersi, is in honor of German herpetologist Wilhelm Peters (1815–1883).

Geographic range

Type locality: "Anamallays, 4000 feet".

Habitat
The preferred natural habitat of U. petersi is forest.

Description
The dorsum of U. petersi is uniformly brown, or brown with yellowish dots. The venter has irregular yellowish spots.

The smooth dorsals are arranged in 17 rows at midbody, in 19 rows behind the head. The ventrals number 151-180, and the subcaudals number 6-11.

The snout is obtusely pointed. The rostral is slightly less than ¼ the length of the shielded part of the head. The portion of the rostral visible from above is shorter than its distance from the frontal. The nasals are in contact with each other behind the rostral. The frontal is longer than broad. The eye is small, its diameter less than ½ the length of the ocular shield. The diameter of the body goes 25 to 33 times into the total length. The ventrals are about two times as large as the contiguous scales. The tail is round or slightly laterally compressed, the terminal dorsal scales distinctly pluricarinate. The terminal scute has a transverse ridge, but without points.

Behaviour
U. petersi is terrestrial and fossorial.

Reproduction
U. petersi is ovoviviparous.

References

Further reading

Beddome, R.H. (1878). "Descriptions of new Uropeltidae from Southern India, with Remarks on some previously-described Species". Proceedings of the Zoological Society of London 1878 (1): 154–155. (Silybura petersi, new species, p. 154).
Beddome, R.H. (1886). "An Account of the Earth-Snakes of the Peninsula of India and Ceylon". Annals and Magazine of Natural History, Fifth Series 17: 3–33. (Silybura Petersi, p. 22).
Boulenger, G.A. (1890). The Fauna of British India, Including Ceylon and Burma. Reptilia and Batrachia. London: Secretary of State for India in Council. (Taylor and Francis, printers). xviii + 541 pp. (Silybura petersii, p. 261).
Sharma, R.C. (2003). Handbook: Indian Snakes. Kolkata: Zoological Survey of India. 292 pp. .
Smith, M.A. (1943). The Fauna of British India, Ceylon and Burma, Including the Whole of the Indo-Chinese Sub-region. Reptilia and Amphibia. Vol. III.—Serpentes. London: Secretary of State for India. (Taylor and Francis, printers). xii + 583 pp. (Uropeltis petersi, new compination, p. 84).

External links
 

Uropeltidae
Reptiles of India
Endemic fauna of the Western Ghats
Reptiles described in 1878
Taxa named by Richard Henry Beddome